Christopher Scrofani (born in the United States) is an American retired soccer player.

Career

After training with English Premier League side Crystal Palace and spending a season with South Jersey Barons in the American third division, Scrofani played professionally for American second division club Virginia Beach Mariners.

References

External links
 Chris Scrofani at SoccerStats.us

American soccer players
Living people
Association football midfielders
Virginia Beach Mariners players
Year of birth missing (living people)